is a fantasy light novel series by Takeshi Shudo (best known for writing the scripts for Magical Princess Minky Momo and Pokémon) which was serialized in Japan in Animage, illustrated by Akemi Takada. The series has been collected into nine volumes published by Tokuma Shoten. An OVA series based on the novels was released from 1992 to 1993. The novel series was also adapted into a role-playing video game released by Tokuma Shoten for the Super Famicom in 1995. It was only released commercially in Japan.

Plot
Eternal Filena follows the adventures of Filena, the only survivor of the royal family in the ocean kingdom of Filosena which is destroyed by the ruling empire. She is brought up as a boy slave and gladiator, and enters the gladiatorial games designed by the Empire to keep the masses happy. Young slave boys are trained as gladiators and girls are forced into prostitution. Filena befriends Lila, a slave assigned to be Filena's bed-mate before her first gladiatorial bout, and sets off on a journey with Lila to free her homeland from tyranny and discover her true past.

Characters

The main character of the series, she is a princess who was raised as a boy after her kingdom was conquered. She is a gladiator and she was taught to fight at the age of six by her adoptive grandfather Zenna. She enters the gladiator fights to win her freedom but finds out later the fights are not what they appear. Filena sets off on a journey with Lila to free her homeland from tyranny and discover her true past. Filena's personality is serious and straightforward, she frequently rebuffs Lila's advances but the two do show a strong bond and as the game progresses the two develop a relationship. 

A slave assigned to be Filena's bed-mate before her first gladiator bout, after Filena ignores her advances she forces her way into Filena's room and learns the truth about her gender. Lila has a peppy and cheerful personality and becomes very close to Filena and tries to cuddle up with her as the story progresses. She tries to become Filena's love interest and is very possessive of her, calling Filena her wife when the male characters show interest in her. She is shown to get very emotional in moments of joy much to Filena's chagrin. She also seems to know about childbirth as she assisted nurses in delivering Amanela's baby.

Nest
A battle writer who writes the scripts for the gladiator fights to keep viewers interested and knows the Devis Empire inside and out. He joins up with Filena and Lila on their journey after they are attacked by the Black Devils and decides to give up being a citizen of the Empire and become a rebel. He is a master of machinery and uses a hammer as his primary weapon as well as a ray gun he invented himself.

Milika
A woman whose husband Ficos enters the gladiator fights to provide for his family, and she has an infant son named Fis. Ficos loses to and is killed by Filena during their bout at Colosseum. Milika is shown to be a protective and caring person but she also has a vengeful side as she holds a grudge against Filena for killing her husband. Early on, Milika distrusts Filena and blinds her with poison as revenge killing her husband on orders by the empire. She also has several arguments with Lila. After, she is saved by Filena and Lila and Nest from a Black Devil attack, she eventually forgives Filena and makes up with them. Milika is a former dancer at a bar in Dora and her knowledge of dancing helps the trio get out of Delacina. She falls to her death after a Black Devil burns the bridge out of Delacinia and Filena keeps Milika's flute to remember her by. Her appearance differs in the anime from the videogame, she has black hair and wears a lavender kimono in the anime and in the videogame wears a purple dress and has blonde hair.

Laris
A man who is the leader of a group of bandits who call the small mountain village Little Laritenia their home. Laris is a tall and muscular man with a distinctive scar on the right side of his face. Laris accompanies the group to the Laritenian Mine Shaft and helps Filena and Lila eliminate the threat of the Black Devils on their hideout. Laris is very protective of his town and people he cares about and he develops a bit of crush on Filena and knows she is a woman. A running gag is that Laris tries to hit on Filena while Lila is not around. Laris becomes separated from the party after a plot to lure the Black Devils out of Laritenia fails, he is attacked and injured by one of them. The fate of Laris is unknown after that since he is not seen through the rest of the game.

Amanela
A woman who is the leader of the Amakune tribe where women rule over the men and she is accompanied her dog Gappy. She is portrayed as having a man's strength and a woman's kindness. She meets up with Filena and Lila on Eru Shulay beach. It is revealed during their exchange that she is pregnant. With help from Lila she eventually gives birth to a healthy baby girl and thereafter joins the group to eliminate the threat of Clechia hunters on Mount Oligot. After being exhausted from childbirth, Amanela decides to stay at the camp and send Gappy in her place.

Gappe/Gappy (Hunter in fan translation)
Amanela's trusted dog companion and he is implied to be a wolf dog hybrid. In battle, he attacks with his teeth and claws. He is shown to be very protective of Amanela, and he quickly forms a strong bond with the party since Amanela trusts them. Amanela sends Gappe along with Filena and Lila after she decides that she can no longer fight with them due to the birth of her child.

Black Devil Baraba (Black Demon Baraba in Japanese)
The Black Devils are the antagonists. They are the leaders of the Devis Empire that rules the land. The Black Devils are shown to take many forms of people.

Zenna
Zenna is Filena's adoptive grandfather and caretaker. He raises Filena as a boy, and teaches Filena how to fight at the age of 6 and become a gladiator.

Fis
Fis is Milika's son. He is an infant in the anime series and seven in the videogame. After his father loses to Filena, he is kidnapped by the empire and used for horrible experiments. He becomes an adult due to the Empire's experiments and becomes an elite soldier of the Empire and swears revenge on Filena for killing his father and killing his mother. Filena gives his mother's flute to Ficos, which calms him down. Unfortunately due to the advanced aging process, Fis dies.

Media

Light novels
The light novel series was serialized in Animage from 1985 until 1994. Interior illustrations as well as cover artwork for the collected volumes were done by Akemi Takada, known for her work on series such as Kimagure Orange Road and Creamy Mami. The series has been collected into nine volumes. The series was popular enough to place in Animage polls for readers' all-time-favorite series as late as 1999.

Anime
A six-episode anime OVA series, with original character designs by Akemi Takada, was released by Tokuma Japan Communications from December 1992 through February 1993 at a rate of two 30-minute episode per month.

A soundtrack for the anime series was released on October 23, 1992, two months prior to the OVA series. The soundtrack was performed by guitarist Jinmo, with vocals for the opening theme song, Ocean, performed by Azumi Inoue.

Cast
Filena: Arisa Andō
Lilla: Yūko Mizutani
Zena: Yūsaku Yara
Baraba: Hideyuki Hori
Nesuto: Ken'yū Horiuchi
Sarah: Ai Orikasa

Sources:

Staff
Original work: Takeshi Shudo
Director: Yoshikata Nitta
Character Designer: Kenzō Koizumi
Animation Director: Kenzō Koizumi
Art Director: Geki Katsumata
Audio Director: Noriyoshi Matsuura
Music: JINMO, Masanori Iimori
Producers: Yukio Kikukawa, Michio Yoko
Original character designs: Akemi Takada
Animation: Studio Pierrot

Sources:

Video game
A role-playing video game based on the series was first released on the Super Famicom in 1995 exclusive to Japan. The game was developed and published by Tokuma Shoten. Eternal Filena was released late into the Super Famicom's life, but despite this it had somewhat dated graphics that were reminiscent of Final Fantasy V and a battle system similar to Final Fantasy Mystic Quest.

The game's story begins with Filena, a girl raised as a boy by her grandfather Zenna. Filena is raised as a boy because the Empire ruling the country forces girls into prostitution and turns boys into gladiators. After turning sixteen, Filena prepares to make her debut in the imperial coliseum, however before the battle she and her fellow gladiators are assigned concubines. Filena ignores her assigned bedmate, Lila, but Lila forces her way into Filena's room and learns the truth about her gender. Filena later fights through the gladiator ranks and discovers that their battles to the death are all scripted by behind-the-scenes writers. Filena then sets off with Lila on a quest to bring down an empire and reclaim her rightful place in a lost kingdom.

The gameplay is typical of role-playing video games of its time, using a turn-based battle system with random encounters with monsters to gain experience and level up. Characters can equip up to three weapons and switch between them. Weapons have different abilities and a character can perform a technique at the cost of ability points.

On release, Famicom Tsūshin scored the game a 23 out of 40.

References

External links

 Column by Takeshi Shudō about the creation of the ova and video game (in Japanese)

1985 Japanese novels
1985 fantasy novels
1992 anime OVAs
1995 video games
Anime and manga based on light novels
Fantasy anime and manga
Japanese fantasy novels
Fantasy video games
Japan-exclusive video games
Light novels
Pierrot (company)
Role-playing video games
Super Nintendo Entertainment System games
Super Nintendo Entertainment System-only games
Tokuma Shoten games
Video games developed in Japan